Great Escape is the second studio album from The Rifles, released on 26 January 2009 after it was delayed from its initial release date of 13 October 2008. The album delay was somewhat attributed to the length of time it took to record. The Rifles used two different producers, Dave McCracken and Stan "Jan" Kybert, as well as recording the album in three different locations.

The Rifles used Dave Davies' (The Kinks) Konk Studios in Crouch End, Dan Hawkins' (The Darkness) studio Leeders Farm, and "The Pool" in Miloco Studios to record the album.

The working title for the album was The Pavement's Diaries.

The album was released in North America on 15 September 2009 through Nettwerk Music Group.

Track listing

 The last track contains a hidden track called "Lazy Bones".

Track listing Japan Edition

 The last track contains a hidden track called "Lazy Bones".

In popular culture
"The Great Escape" was used on the soundtrack of the 2011 video game Test Drive Unlimited 2.

"Winter Calls" was used on a Dasani water commercial, and in several episodes of the third series of BBC comedy Gavin & Stacey.

Personnel
Cello - Ian Burdge (tracks: 2,10,11)
Viola - John Metcalfe (tracks: 2), N. Baw (tracks: 10,11)
Violin - Louisa Fuller, Sally Herbert (tracks: 2), Emlyn Singleton, Warren Zielinski (tracks: 10,11)
Trumpet - Daniel Newell (tracks: 10,11)

Production
Producer - Dave McCraken (tracks: 2,5,6,7), Stan Kybert (tracks: 1,3,4,8-12)
Engineer - Andy Saunders (tracks: 1,3,4,8-12), Gergus Peterkin (tracks: 7), Richard Wilkinson, Serg (tracks: 2,5,6)
Additional Engineer - Dario Dendi (tracks: 1,3,4,8-12)
Mastering - Ted Jensen
Additional Mastering - Guy Davie
Mixing - Stephen Harris (tracks: 1,3,4,8-12), Steve Fitzmaurice (tracks: 2,5,6,7)
Photography - Oliver Twitchett

References

2009 albums
The Rifles (band) albums
679 Artists albums
Nettwerk Records albums